Chad Bassen (born April 25, 1983) is a Canadian-German professional ice hockey forward who is currently playing with EHC Freiburg of the DEL2. Bassen holds a Canadian and a German passport, part of his family come from Germany. His uncle Mark Bassen also played professionally.

Playing career 
Bassen played in the WHL for the Regina Pats, Vancouver Giants, Medicine Hat Tigers and Everett Silvertips before taking his game overseas. In 2004, he signed his first contract in Germany, joining the Frankfurt Lions of the top-flight Deutsche Eishockey Liga (DEL). He left the Lions after the 2006–07 season and moved to the Straubing Tigers, where he spent the following three years.

He then played for the Hamburg Freezers during the 2010–11 DEL season. On April 6, 2011, Bassen signed with Augsburger Panther to a one-year contract. After the conclusion of his second season with Augsburg in 2012–13, Bassen was released as a free agent and signed for his fifth DEL club, EHC Wolfsburg on July 15, 2013.

Prior to the 2014–15 campaign, Bassen agreed to terms on a contract with fellow DEL side Iserlohn Roosters.

Entering the 2018–19 season, Bassen left the Roosters and agreed to a one-year contract with the Thomas Sabo Ice Tigers on September 12, 2018. Rejuvenated by the change of scenery, Bassen regained his offensive touch and during the campaign on January 30, 2019, he was signed to a one-year extension to remain with the Ice Tigers through 2020.

Career statistics

References

External links

1983 births
Living people
Augsburger Panther players
Everett Silvertips players
Frankfurt Lions players
EHC Freiburg players
Hamburg Freezers players
Iserlohn Roosters players
Medicine Hat Tigers players
Regina Pats players
Straubing Tigers players
Thomas Sabo Ice Tigers players
Vancouver Giants players
Grizzlys Wolfsburg players
Canadian expatriate ice hockey players in Germany
Canadian ice hockey left wingers